Wine is a 1924 American silent melodrama film directed by Louis J. Gasnier, produced and released by Universal Pictures under their 'Jewel' banner. The film, which featured Clara Bow in her first starring role, is currently classified as lost.

Synopsis
Set during the Prohibition Era, Wine exposes the widespread liquor traffic in the upper-classes. Bow portrays an innocent girl who develops into a "wild redhot mama".

Cast

Reviews
"If not taken as information, it is cracking good entertainment", Carl Sandburg reviewed September 29. 
"Don't miss Wine. It's a thoroughly refreshing draught ... there are only about five actresses who give me a real thrill on the screen – and Clara is nearly five of them", Grace Kingsley in The Los Angeles Times August 24.

See also
List of lost films

References

External links

Wine at silentera.com

Poster featuring Clara Bow
Stills at silenthollywood.com

1924 films
1924 drama films
Silent American drama films
American silent feature films
American black-and-white films
Films based on short fiction
Films directed by Louis J. Gasnier
Lost American films
Universal Pictures films
Melodrama films
1924 lost films
Lost drama films
1920s American films
1920s English-language films
English-language drama films